The Bishop of Chelmsford is the Ordinary of the Church of England Diocese of Chelmsford in the Province of Canterbury.

The current bishop is Guli Francis-Dehqani, since the confirmation of her election on 11 March 2021.

History
The diocese was founded in 1914 under George V from the Diocese of Saint Albans (of which it had been a part since 1877).

The present diocese covers the County of Essex including those parts of Essex added to Greater London on 1 April 1965 and Ballingdon-with-Brundon, transferred to Suffolk and Great/Little Chishill and Heydon, transferred to Cambridgeshire in 1894. The see is in the city of Chelmsford where the seat is located at the Cathedral Church of Saint Mary, Saint Peter and Saint Cedd which was elevated to cathedral status in 1914. The bishop's residence is Bishopscourt, Margaretting.

List of bishops

Assistant bishops
Assistant bishops of the diocese have included:
19611966 (res.): Geoffrey Stuart Smith was an assistant bishop; he was also Rector of Danbury from 1960.
19721974: Br John-Charles SSF, former Assistant Bishop of Adelaide and Bishop of Polynesia
The appointment of Cecil de Carteret, Bishop of Jamaica, to be an assistant bishop was announced in 1931, but he died before he could take it up.

References

External links
 Crockford's Clerical Directory - Listings

Chelmsford
 
Diocese of Chelmsford
Bishops of Chelmsford